The 2nd Special Service Brigade was formed in late 1943 in the Middle East and saw service in Italy, the Adriatic, the landings at Anzio and took part in operations in Yugoslavia.
On 6 December 1944 the Brigade was renamed 2nd Commando Brigade, removing the title Special Service and its association with the Schutzstaffel.

Italian Campaign
The brigade as a formation, was not involved in Operation Husky, the Allied invasion of Sicily, but 40 RM Commando was involved in the assault landings as Army Troops. In Operation Shingle, the assault at Anzio, No. 9 (Army) Commando and No. 43 (Royal Marine) Commando were the only units involved. The whole brigade would be involved in the final offensive of the Italian Campaign.

In 1945 the brigade was involved in the Lake Comacchio battle, Operation Roast, where Corporal Thomas Peck Hunter of 43 Commando was posthumously awarded the Victoria Cross for conspicuous Gallantry in single-handedly clearing a farmstead housing three Spandau machine guns after charging across 200 metres of open ground firing his Bren gun from the hip, then moving to an exposed position to draw fire away from his comrades by engaging further Spandaus entrenched on the far side of the canal. After Operation Roast the brigade was involved in the follow-up actions until the German surrender.

The brigade remained in the area on security duties until it was disbanded in 1946

Formation
Brigadier Ronnie Tod
No. 2 Commando
No. 9 Commando
No 40 Royal Marine Commando
No 43 Royal Marine Commando

Battle honours
The following Battle honours were awarded to British Commandos during the Second World War.

Adriatic
Alethangyaw
Aller
Anzio
Argenta Gap
Burma 1943–45
Crete
Dieppe
Dives Crossing
Djebel Choucha
Flushing
Greece 1944–45
Italy 1943–45
Kangaw
Landing at Porto San Venere
Landing in Sicily
Leese
Litani
Madagascar
Middle East 1941, 1942, 1944
Monte Ornito
Myebon
Normandy Landing
North Africa 1941–43
North-West Europe 1942, 1944–1945
Norway 1941
Pursuit to Messina
Rhine
St. Nazaire
Salerno
Sedjenane 1
Sicily 1943
Steamroller Farm
Syria 1941
Termoli
Vaagso
Valli di Comacchio
Westkapelle

See also
1st Special Service Brigade
3rd Special Service Brigade
4th Special Service Brigade
British Commandos

References

Special service brigades of the British Army
1943 establishments in the United Kingdom
Military units and formations established in 1943
Military units and formations disestablished in 1946